The Native News Today is a weekly television show hosted by Gerald Wofford a (Cherokee) citizen and Jason Salsman a (Muscogee) citizen. It looks at various events happening throughout Indian Country from an Indian perspective and also endeavors to show some of the good that Native Americans and Indian Tribes are doing throughout their areas. It is in the format of a news program. Produced by the Muscogee (Creek) Nation Communications Department, it airs on KQCW channel 19 in Tulsa, Oklahoma, Saturdays at 1:30 p.m. Until April 6, Native News Today aired on Cox Channel 3 in Tulsa, Saturdays at 11 a.m.

The show is the first of its kind in that it is the only all-Native American show to have its hosts go out to the events they cover bringing back footage and interviews.

Local news programming in the United States
Native American history of Oklahoma
Native American television series
Native Americans in Tulsa, Oklahoma